Ustad or Ostad is a professor, teacher, master musician, artist, or scholar.

Ostad may also refer to:
Ostad, North Khorasan, Iran, a village with a population around 450
Ostad, Gonabad County, Razavi Khorasan, Iran, a village with a population around 300
Bakharz, Bakharz County, Razavi Khorasan, Iran (also known as Ostad and Ostad Bakharz), a city with a population around 7000
 Sandra Ostad (born 1990), Norwegian artistic gymnast

See also
 Ostad Teymurtash, North Khorasan Province, Iran, a village with a population around 300
 Ostad Kolayeh, Gilan Province, Iran, a village with a population around 500
 Usted